The 1969 Australian Drivers' Championship was a CAMS sanctioned Australian motor racing title for drivers of cars conforming to Australian National Formula or Australian Formula 2 regulations. The championship was contested over a six race series with the winner awarded the 1969 CAMS Gold Star. It was the thirteenth Australian Drivers' Championship to be awarded by CAMS.

Kevin Bartlett won his second Australian Drivers' Championship driving the Mildren Mono which was powered by an Alfa Romeo V8 engine in the early races and by a Waggott TC4V inline 4 for the last three races. Bartlett won three of the six races to finish 16 points ahead of Leo Geoghegan (Lotus 39 Repco). Bartlett's Alec Mildren Racing team mate Max Stewart finished third in the points standings, driving the Mildren Waggott built by Rennmax Engineering.

In addition to Bartlett's three wins, single race victories were taken by Jack Brabham (Repco Brabham BT31), John Harvey (Repco Brabham BT23E) and Garrie Cooper (Elfin 600C Repco).

Race schedule

The championship was contested over a six race series.

Points system
Championship points were awarded on a 9-6-4-3-2-1 basis to the first six placegetters in each race.
Each driver could only the points earned in his or her best five race results.
Only holders of a current and valid General Competition License issued by CAMS were eligible.

Championship results

Championship name
The 1969 championship has been referred to under various names including Australian Championship for Drivers, Australian Gold Star Championship, Gold Star Championship, Gold Star Series and Australian Drivers' Championship. The latter is used by CAMS in its historical records of the championship.

Notes and references

Australian Drivers' Championship
Drivers' Championship